Karl Johnson may refer to:

Karl Johnson (actor) (born 1948), Welsh actor
Karl Johnson (wrestler) (1883–1952), Swedish wrestler
Karl Johnson (rugby league), New Zealand rugby league player 
Karl Johnson (American football), see List of NCAA football records
Karl Johnson (virologist), American virologist
Karl G. Johnson, American neuroscientist

See also
Carl Johnson (disambiguation)